Shahrak-e Chalab (also Romanized as Shahrak-e Chālāb) is a village in Mohsen Ab Rural District, in the Central District of Mehran County, Ilam Province, Iran. At the 2006 census, its population was 1,973, in 451 families.

References 

Populated places in Mehran County